Cho Hyun-oh (born May 15, 1955) is the former commissioner of the National Police Agency of South Korea. He was born in Busan and graduated from Korea University. He expressed his decision to resign over a controversial Murder case in Suwon.

Experience

August 2010  ~ - 16th commissioner of the National Police Agency
January 2010 ~ August 2010 - Commissioner of Seoul Metropolitan Police Agency
January 2009 ~ January 2010 - Commissioner of Gyeonggi Provincial Police Agency 	
2008 ~ January 2009 - Commissioner of Busan Metropolitan Police Agency

Controversy

Roh Mu-hyun
Cho Hyun-oh mentioned in the press that the reason for Roh Mu-hyun's motivation to commit suicide was his falsely-named bank accounts that had been exposed to the public. Cho was later sued for his controversial comments. In December 2010, he denied that he made a verifiable negative remark about Roh in the past.

Incheon Gangster Crisis
Cho Hyun-oh was criticized for the police's mishandling of a massive brawl between the police and gangsters on October 21, 2011, in Incheon.

Special Promotion
Cho Hyun-oh was criticized for personally promoting a close associate within the police hierarchy.

See also
DDoS attacks during the October 2011 South Korean by-election

References

External links
  Cho Hyun-oh's profile on Naver

People from Busan
1955 births
Korea University alumni
South Korean police officers
Living people
Busan High School alumni
Haman Jo clan